Nassim Diafat (born 24 July 1983) is the Algerian Deputy Minister for Incubators. He was appointed as minister on 2 January 2020.

References 

21st-century Algerian politicians
Algerian politicians
Government ministers of Algeria
1983 births
Living people